Nova Odesa Raion was a subdivision of Mykolaiv Oblast of Ukraine. Its administrative center was the town of Nova Odesa. The raion was abolished on 18 July 2020 as part of the administrative reform of Ukraine, which reduced the number of raions of Mykolaiv Oblast to four. The area of Nova Odesa Raion was merged into Mykolaiv Raion. The last estimate of the raion population was 

At the time of disestablishment, the raion consisted of three hromadas, 
 Kostiantynivka rural hromada with the administration in the selo of Kostiantynivka;
 Nova Odesa urban hromada with the administration in Nova Odesa;
 Sukhyi Yelanets rural hromada with the administration in the selo of Sukhyi Yelanets.

References

Former raions of Mykolaiv Oblast
1923 establishments in Ukraine
Ukrainian raions abolished during the 2020 administrative reform